Palladium hydride is metallic palladium that contains a substantial quantity of hydrogen within its crystal lattice. Despite its name, it is not an ionic hydride but rather an alloy of palladium with metallic hydrogen that can be written PdHx. At room temperature, palladium hydrides may contain two crystalline phases, α and β (sometimes called α'). Pure α-phase exists at x < 0.017 whereas pure β-phase is realised for x > 0.58; intermediate x values correspond to α-β mixtures.

Hydrogen absorption by palladium is reversible and therefore has been investigated for hydrogen storage. Palladium electrodes have been used in some cold fusion experiments, under the hypothesis that the hydrogen could be "squeezed" between the palladium atoms to help them fuse at lower temperatures than would otherwise be required.

History
The absorption of hydrogen gas by palladium was first noted by T. Graham in 1866 and absorption of electrolytically produced hydrogen, where hydrogen was absorbed into a palladium cathode, was first documented in 1939. Graham produced an alloy with the composition PdH0.75.

Making palladium hydride
Metals are arranged in lattices, and in forming metallic hydrides, the hydrogen atoms place themselves in interstitial sites in the lattice. This is also the case for palladium hydride. When the surface of a palladium lattice is brought in contact with a H2 molecule the two hydrogen atoms split, each absorbed onto an interstitial site. The interstitial placing of hydrogen can lead to a non-stoichiometric mixture, i.e., the ratio of palladium and hydrogen cannot be represented by a natural number. 

When Pd is brought into a H2 environment with a pressure of 1 atm, the resulting concentration of H reaches x ~ 0.7. However, the concentration of H to obtain superconductivity is higher. Therefore, the concentration of H should be increased, to x > 0.75. This is done via three different routes. It is known that hydrogen easily desorbs from palladium; therefore, extra care should be taken to prevent H desorption from Pd.  

The first route is loading from gas phase. A Pd sample is placed into a high-pressure cell of H2, at room temperature. The H2 is added through a capillary. As a result, H is loaded onto Pd. To maintain this bonding, the pressure cell will be cooled to liquid N2 temperature (77 K). The resulting concentration is found to be [H]/[Pd] = 0.97.

The second route is electrochemical bonding. This is a method where the critical concentration for superconductivity can easily be exceeded without using a high-pressure environment, via a reaction as equilibrium between H in an electrochemical phase and H in a solid phase. The hydrogen is added to Pd and Pd–Ni alloys by an H concentration of ~0.95. Thereafter, it has been loaded into electrolysis of 0.1n-H2SO4 with a current density of 50 to 150 mA/cm3. Finally, after lowering the loading temperature to ~ 190 K, a H concentration of x ~ 1 has been reached. 

The third route is known as ion implantation. Before the implantation of H ions into Pd, the Pd foil was pre-charged with H. This is done in a H2 high-temperature gas. This shortens the implantation time which follows. The concentration reached is about x ~ 0.7. Afterwards the foil is cooled to a temperature of 77 K to prevent a loss of H before the implantation can take place. The implantation of H in PdHx happens at a temperature of 4 K. The H ions penetrate in a H2+-beam. This results in a high concentration layer of H in a Pd foil.

Chemical structure and properties

Palladium is sometimes metaphorically called a "metal sponge" (not to be confused with more literal metal sponges) because it soaks up hydrogen "like a sponge soaks up water".
At room temperature and atmospheric pressure (standard ambient temperature and pressure),
palladium can absorb up to 900 times its own volume of hydrogen.
Hydrogen can be absorbed into the metal-hydride and then desorbed back out for thousands of cycles. Researchers look for ways to extend the useful life of palladium storage.

Size effect

The absorption of hydrogen produces two different phases, both of which contain palladium metal atoms in a face-centered cubic (fcc, rocksalt) lattice, which is the same structure as pure palladium metal. At low concentrations up to PdH0.02 the palladium lattice expands slightly, from 388.9 pm to 389.5 pm. Above this concentration the second phase appears with a lattice constant of 402.5 pm. Both phases coexist until a composition of PdH0.58 when the alpha phase disappears. Neutron diffraction studies have shown that hydrogen atoms randomly occupy the octahedral interstices in the metal lattice (in an fcc lattice there is one octahedral hole per metal atom). The limit of absorption at normal pressures is PdH0.7, indicating that approximately 70% of the octahedral holes are occupied. When x=1 is reached, the octahedral interstices are fully occupied. The absorption of hydrogen is reversible, and hydrogen rapidly diffuses through the metal lattice. Metallic conductivity reduces as hydrogen is absorbed, until at around PdH0.5 the solid becomes a semiconductor.

This formation of the bulk hydride does depend on the size of the catalyst Pd. When Pd becomes smaller than 2.6nm, hydrides will not be formed anymore.  

Hydrogen dissolved in the bulk differ from hydrogen dissolved on the surface. When the particles of palladium decrease in size, less hydrogen dissolves in these smaller pd particles. Therefore, relatively more hydrogen adsorbs on the surface of the small particles. This hydrogen adsorbed onto the particles do not form an hydride. Therefore, bigger particles have more places available for the formation of hydrides.

Electron and phonon band

The most important property of the band structure of PdH(oct) is that filled Pd states are lowered with the presence of hydrogen. Also, the lowest energy levels, which are the bonding states, of PdH are lower than that of Pd.

Additionally, empty Pd states, that are below the fermi energy, are also lowered with the presence of H. 

Palladium prefers to be with hydrogen due to the interaction between the s state of hydrogen and the p states of palladium. The energy of an independent H atom lies in the energy range of the dominating p-states of the Pd bands.  

Therefore, these empty states under the fermi-energy and holes in the d-band are filled. 

Additionally, the hydride formation raises the fermi level above the d band. Empty states, above the d-band, are also filled. This results in filled p-states and shifts the ‘edge’ to a higher energy level.

Superconductivity
PdHx is a superconductor with a transition temperature Tc of about 9 K for x = 1. (Pure palladium is not superconducting). Drops in resistivity vs. temperature curves were observed at higher temperatures (up to 273 K) in hydrogen-rich (x ~ 1), nonstoichiometric palladium hydride and interpreted as superconducting transitions. These results have been questioned  and have not been confirmed thus far.

A great advantage of Palladium-hydride over many other hydride-systems is that Palladium-hydride does not need to be highly pressurized to become superconducting. This makes measurements easier and gives more opportunity for different kinds of measurements (many superconducting materials require extreme pressurization to be able to superconduct, on the order of 102 GPa. Palladium-hydride could therefore also be used to explore the role that hydrogen plays in these hydride-systems being superconductors.

Susceptibility

One of the magnetic properties of Palladium hydride is susceptibility. The susceptibility of PdHx varies largely when changing the concentration of H. This is due to the 𝛽-phase of PdHx. The 𝛼-phase of PdH lies in the same range of the fermi surface as Pd itself, therefore 𝛼-phase does not influence the susceptibility. However, the 𝛽-phase of PdHx is characterized by s-electrons filling the d-band. Therefore, the susceptibility of the 𝛼-𝛽 mixture decreases at room temperature with an increasing concentration of H. Finally, when the spin fluctuations of pure Pd are decreased, the superconductivity will occur.

Specific heat capacity
Another metallic property is the electronic heat coefficient 𝛾. This coefficient depends on the density of states. For pure Pd the heat coefficient is 9.5 mJ(mol∙K^2). When H is added to the pure Pd, the electronic heat coefficient drops. For the range of x=0.83 to x=0.88 𝛾 is observed to be six times smaller than in the case of only Pd. This region is the superconducting region. However, Zimmerman et al also measured the heat coefficient 𝛾 for a concentration of x=0.96. A broadening of the superconducting transition was observed at this concentration. One of the reasons for this could be explained by an inhomogeneity of the macroscopic structure of PdH. 𝛾 at this value of x has a large fluctuation and is therefore uncertain.

The critical concentration for superconductivity to happen is estimated to be x ~ 0.72. The critical temperature or the superconducting transition temperature is estimated to be 9 K. This was achieved at a stoichiometric concentration of x = 1.

Furthermore, the pressure influences the critical temperature as well. It is shown that an increase in the pressure on PdHx decreases Tc. This can be explained by a hardening of the phonon spectrum, which includes a decrease in the electron-phonon constant 𝜆 .

Surface absorption process
The process of absorption of hydrogen has been shown by scanning tunnelling microscopy to require aggregates of at least three vacancies on the surface of the crystal to promote the dissociation of the hydrogen molecule. The reason for such a behaviour and the particular structure of trimers has been analyzed.

Uses
The absorption of hydrogen is reversible and is highly selective. Industrially, a palladium-based diffuser separator is used. Impure gas is passed through tubes of thin walled silver-palladium alloy as protium and deuterium readily diffuse through the alloy membrane. The gas that comes through is pure and ready for use. Palladium is alloyed with silver to improve its strength and resistance to embrittlement. To ensure that the formation of the beta phase is avoided, as the lattice expansion noted earlier would cause distortions and splitting of the membrane, the temperature is maintained above 300 °C.

Another use of Palladium-Hydride is increased adsorption of H2-molecules with respect to pure Palladium. In 2009, a study was conducted which tested this fact. At a pressure of 1 bar, the probability was measured of Hydrogen molecules sticking to the surface of Palladium versus the probability of sticking to surface of Palladium-hydride. The sticking probability of Palladium was found to be greater at temperatures where the phase of the used Palladium and hydrogen mixture was pure β-phase, which is in this context corresponds to Palladium-hydride (at 1 bar this means temperatures greater than roughly 160 degrees Celsius), as opposed to temperatures where β- and α-phases coexist and even lower temperatures where there is pure α-phase (α-phase here corresponds to a solid solution of Hydrogen atoms in Palladium). Knowing these sticking probabilities enables one to calculate the rate of adsorption  by virtue of the equation 

When the system is in a steady state, we must have that the rate of adsorption and, oppositely, the rate of desorption are equal. This gives 

The rate of desorption is assumed to be given by a Boltzmannian distribution, i.e. 

(*)

It was found that, within the uncertainty of their experiment, the values for of Palladium and Palladium-hydride respectively were roughly equal. Thus Palladium-hydride has as higher average adsorption rate than Palladium, while the energy required for desorption is the same. 

Density functional theory was performed to find an explanation for this fact. It was found that the bond of hydrogen with the Palladium-hydride surface is weaker than the bond with the Palladium surface and that the desorption activation barrier is lower by a small amount for Palladium-hydride than for Palladium, although the adsorption barriers are comparable in magnitude. Moreover, the heat of adsorption is lower for Palladium-hydride than for Palladium, which leads to lower equilibrium surface coverage of H. This means that the surface of Palladium-hydride would be less saturated, which leads to greater opportunity for sticking, i.e. a higher sticking probability. 

The reversible absorption of Palladium is a means to store hydrogen, and the above findings indicate that even in the hydrogen-absorbed state of Palladium, there is further opportunity for hydrogen storing.

See also
Hydrogen sensor

References

External links

Palladium compounds
Metal hydrides